Isaac Shaze (born 25 June 1989) is a Ghanaian footballer who plays as a midfielder for FC Trollhättan.

Career

Shaze played college football in England.

He started his career with English tenth division side Ledbury Town.

In 2009, Shaze signed for Forest Green Rovers in the English fifth division.

In 2010, he signed for English seventh division club Evesham United

In 2011, he signed for Östersund in the Swedish fourth division, helping them achieve promotion to the Swedish second division within 2 seasons.

Before the 2014 season, Shaze signed for Swedish third division team Umeå FC.

Before the 2018 season, he signed for TB/FC Suðuroy/Royn in the Faroe Islands.

In 2018, he signed for Swedish second division outfit Gefle.

Before the 2019 season, Shaze signed for KPV in Finland, where he made 21 appearances and scored 0 goals. On 25 January 2019, he debuted for KPV during a 1–1 draw with KuPS.

Before the 2020 season, he signed for Swedish third division side FC Trollhättan.

References

External links
 
 

Ghanaian footballers
Expatriate footballers in the Faroe Islands
Expatriate footballers in Sweden
Expatriate footballers in Finland
Association football midfielders
Living people
Forest Green Rovers F.C. players
Veikkausliiga players
Superettan players
Ettan Fotboll players
Faroe Islands Premier League players
Ghanaian expatriate sportspeople in Sweden
Ghanaian expatriate sportspeople in Finland
Östersunds FK players
Umeå FC players
Östers IF players
Gefle IF players
Kokkolan Palloveikot players
FC Trollhättan players
Ghanaian expatriate sportspeople in England
Ghanaian expatriate footballers
Expatriate footballers in England
1989 births